PJSC VimpelCom ( or full name , PAO «Vympel-Kommunikatsii») is a Russian telecommunications company started in 1992 when its co-founders, Dr. Dmitry Zimin and Augie K. Fabela II came together to pioneer the Russian mobile industry. Augie Fabela, who was then a young entrepreneur from the US, and Dr. Zimin who was a Russian scientist in his 50s, together launched the Beeline brand.

PJSC VimpelCom is the third-largest wireless and second-largest telecom operator in Russia. VimpelCom's main competitors in Russia are Mobile TeleSystems and MegaFon.

PJSC VimpelCom's headquarters is located in Moscow. It is wholly owned by Veon.

History 

The company was founded in 1992 in Moscow, Russia and initially operated AMPS/D-AMPS network in Moscow and Moscow Oblast.

The brand "Beeline" was created in 1993.

In 1996 OJSC VimpelCom became the first Russian company listed on the New York Stock Exchange.

In 1997 the company began GSM network roll-out and in 2001 it started GSM networks throughout Russia's regions.

On February 29, 2008 OJSC VimpelCom completed a merger with Golden Telecom. In October 2008 OJSC VimpelCom acquired a 49.9% stake in Euroset, the largest mobile retailer in Russia and the CIS.

In 2010 the ticker “VIP” was transferred to VimpelCom Ltd. holding. In February 2017, VimpelCom renamed itself Veon, after the messaging platform that it had developed.

On April 14, 2005, the company decreased its net income in 2002 and 2003 as a result of this restatement: 2002 - $2.8 million or 2.2%, 2003 - $5.2 million or 2.2%.

References

External links 

 About company 
 beeline.ru 

.
Telecommunications companies of Russia
Internet service providers of Russia
Mobile phone companies of Russia
Companies based in Moscow
Telecommunications companies established in 1992
1992 establishments in Russia
Telenor
VEON